Macquarie University Village in Marsfield, New South Wales was originally developed by Macquarie University in 2001 for the purpose of housing students adjacent to the university campus and also housed Olympians for the Sydney 2000 Olympics. As of 2006, the village is now operated by Campus Living Villages, a company operating University Villages across Australia. The University Village contains 890 rooms and is located on land next to the campus. So far, the first two stages have been completed and is expected that the university will be delivering Stage 3 on campus for occupancy in the first semester of 2013. The project will consist of approximately 1,000 beds and have a mixed configuration of room numbers with associated common rooms. The buildings will be located north of the Aquatic Centre. Stage 3 will be followed by subsequent stages in what will ultimately be an aggregate of 5,000 student beds on campus.

References

External links
 Macquarie University Village Website
 Campus Living Villages Website

Residential colleges of Macquarie University
Marsfield, New South Wales